East Northumberland Secondary School (ENSS) is a secondary school in Brighton, Ontario, Canada.

The school was the topic of a song performed by Miley Cyrus called "East Northumberland High", written by ENSS's own Samantha Moore.

Sports
Sports at the school include Curling, Soccer, Basketball, Volleyball, Badminton, Rugby, Cross Country, and Track and Field. For 27 years straight ENSS has captured the Bay of Quinte title.

Reputation as a "Green" School

Over the years, ENSS has been known as a "Green" school, with regular garbage clean-ups, tree-plantings, and a heavily involved Environmental Club. ENSS installed a wind turbine in June 2009, generating power and reducing ENSS's carbon footprint. In the summer of 2011, ENSS installed solar panels on the roof of the school.

See also
List of high schools in Ontario

References

External links
 

High schools in Northumberland County, Ontario
Educational institutions established in 1950
1950 establishments in Ontario